The Bobbio Scholiast (commonly abbreviated schol. Bob.) was an anonymous scholiast working in the 7th century at the monastery of Bobbio and known for his annotations of texts from classical antiquity. He is a unique source for some information about ancient Rome, particularly biographical data and certain details of historical events, and appears to have had access to sources now lost.

Although many commentaries and scholia were produced at the monastery, which was famous for its literary culture and vast library, the label "Bobbio Scholiast" has attached itself mainly to the scholia on a selection of Cicero's speeches.

Editions
Hildebrant, Paul. Scholia in Ciceronis orationes bobiensia. Leipzig 1907, Teubner edition reprinted 1971. Full text (1907) online.
Stangl, Thomas. Ciceronis orationum scholiastae.  Leipzig 1912, vol. 2.

External links
Latin text of Scholia Bobiensia in HTML format
English translation of excerpts from Scholia Bobiensia

Classical philologists
7th-century Latin writers
7th-century Italian writers